Heinrich von Rübenach, O.P. (died 1493) was a Roman Catholic prelate who served as Auxiliary Bishop of Mainz (1457–1493).

Biography
Heinrich von Rübenach was ordained a priest in the Order of Preachers. On 9 Jul 1457, he was appointed during the papacy of Pope Callixtus III as Auxiliary Bishop of Mainz and Titular Bishop of Venecompensus. He served as Auxiliary Bishop of Mainz until his death on 13 Oct 1493.

References

External links and additional sources
 (for Chronology of Bishops) 
 (for Chronology of Bishops) 
 (for Chronology of Bishops)  

15th-century German Roman Catholic bishops
Bishops appointed by Pope Callixtus III
1493 deaths
Dominican bishops